The 2011 Premier League Knock-Out Cup was the 44th edition of the Knockout Cup for tier two teams in British speedway.

Summary
It was contested throughout the 2011 Premier League Season. The Reigning champions from 2010, the Newcastle Diamonds were narrowly eliminated by the Glasgow Tigers in the semi-final stages. However the competition was won by the Newport Wasps who defeated the league champions Glasgow Tigers, 106–74 on aggregate.

Knock-Out Stages
{{Round16

|RD1=Round 1
| |Berwick Bandits|BYE|-|-
| |Leicester Lions|86|Glasgow Tigers|94
| |Somerset Rebels| 97|Plymouth Devils| 83
| |Rye House Rockets| 77 |Newcastle Diamonds| 89| |Sheffield Tigers| 94|Edinburgh Monarchs| 86
| |Redcar Bears| 79|Workington Comets| 101
| |Scunthorpe Scorpions| 90 |Ipswich Witches| 90| |-|-|Newport Wasps|BYE

| |Berwick Bandits|83 |Glasgow Tigers |96 
| |Somerset Rebels |83 |Newcastle Diamonds |97| |Sheffield Tigers|89 |Workington Comets |91| |Ipswich Witches |74 |Newport Wasps|106| |Glasgow Tigers |93 |Newcastle Diamonds |87 
| |Workington Comets |77 |Newport Wasps |103| |Glasgow Tigers |74 |Newport Wasps |106|3rdplace=no}}

Round 1
The draw for the 2011 Premier League KOC was taking at the 2010 AGM. 12 teams were drawn against each other, with 2 teams receiving 'byes' into the Quarter Finals. These two teams that received a bye were the Berwick Bandits and the Newport Wasps. The Kings Lynn Stars were originally going to face the Somerset Rebels, however due to their election to compete in the Elite League, the new premier league side, the Plymouth Devils would now face the Rebels. As Scunthorpe and Ipswich tied 90–90 on aggregate, their matches were replayed.Aggregate ScoresFirst legSecond legReplayQuarter finalsAggregate ScoresFirst legSecond legSemi finalsAggregate ScoresFirst legSecond legFinalFirst legSecond legNewport were declared Knockout Cup Champions, winning on aggregate 106–74'''.

See also
Speedway in the United Kingdom
Knockout Cup (speedway)

References

2011 in speedway
Speedway Premier League
Premier League Knock-Out Cup